St Mirren Football Club is a Scottish professional football club based in Paisley, Renfrewshire, that competes in the Scottish Premiership after winning the 2017–18 Scottish Championship. Founded in 1877, the team has two nicknames: The Buddies and The Saints.

St Mirren have won the Scottish Cup three times, in 1926, 1959 and 1987, and the Scottish League Cup in 2013. They have played in European competition four times: in the UEFA Cup Winners' Cup in 1987–88 and the UEFA Cup in 1980–81, 1983–84 and 1985–86. They are the only Scottish team to win the Anglo-Scottish Cup, beating Bristol City 5–1 over two legs in 1979–80.

The club's home ground since 2009 is St Mirren Park, an all-seater stadium on Greenhill Road, Paisley. It has a capacity of 7,937. The club's former home from 1894 until 2009 was also officially named St Mirren Park, but was more commonly known as Love Street.

History 
St Mirren FC was originally a gentlemen's club which was formed in the second half of the 19th century and played, among other sports, cricket and rugby. The increasing popularity of football ensured that by 1877 the members had decided to play association football and 1877 is the football club's official foundation date. They are named after Saint Mirin, the founder of a church at the site of Paisley Abbey and Patron Saint of Paisley. There is also a street in Paisley named St Mirren Street. The team's first strip was scarlet and blue but, after one season, the club changed to the current black and white striped shirts, which have been worn every season bar one in the 1900s, when cream tops were used.

St Mirren played their first match on 6 October 1877, defeating Johnstone Britannia 1–0 at Shortroods. Two years later, the club moved to another ground named Thistle Park at Greenhills. St Mirren's first Scottish Cup match was on 4 September 1880, a 3–0 victory over Johnstone Athletic. The following year, St Mirren reached their first cup final but were beaten 3–1 by Thornliebank in the Renfrewshire Cup. In 1883, the scores were reversed with St Mirren winning the Renfrewshire Cup, 3–1 against Thornliebank. It was in 1883 that the club moved to its third home, that of West March (early maps indicate the area as West March rather than the commonly used Westmarch), defeating Queen's Park in the first game there. In 1885, St Mirren played their first match against Morton, resulting in a defeat.

The 1890 season was a historic season for St Mirren, as they became founder members of the Scottish Football League along with fellow Paisley club Abercorn. Of the eleven founder clubs, only five survive in the current league system. It was during the match against Morton at Cappielow in 1890 that St Mirren played one of the first night games under light from oil lamps. The club moved to Love Street in 1894 and the team reached their first Scottish Cup final in the 1907–08 season but were defeated 5–1 by Celtic. St Mirren went on to lift the trophy in 1926, 1959 and 1987.

In 1922, St Mirren were invited to play in the Barcelona Cup invitational tournament to celebrate the inauguration of Les Corts, the then home of Barcelona. They won the tournament by beating Notts County in the final.

In the 1979–80 season, St Mirren achieved their equal highest-ever finish in the top-flight finishing third behind Aberdeen and Celtic. That season Saints also became the first and last Scottish club to win the Anglo-Scottish Cup, defeating Bristol City in a two-legged final. The following season, St Mirren competed in European competition for the first time and won their initial game 2–1 vs. IF Elfsborg in Sweden, followed by a 0–0 draw in the second leg. The next round saw them play French team Saint-Étienne. Although St Mirren's home leg ended up a 0–0 draw, Saint-Étienne pulled off a 2–0 victory in the second leg to put St Mirren out of the cup.

The club have been relegated from the Scottish Premier League twice (2000–01) and (2014–15) and the Premier Division of the Scottish Football League once (1991–92) having escaped relegation from the latter in 1991 after league re-construction. In 2001, St Mirren finished bottom of the Premier League despite losing only one of their final seven matches. The Saints however managed promotion after clinching the First Division title in 2005–06, a season which also saw St Mirren win the Scottish Challenge Cup, defeating Hamilton Academical 2–1 in the final at Airdrie United's ground, the Shyberry Excelsior Stadium, with goals from Simon Lappin and John Sutton.

In 2010, they reached the final of the Scottish League Cup where they were defeated 0–1 by Rangers despite having a two-man advantage. However, three days later, they recorded a famous win over Celtic, a match that The Buddies won 4–0 with doubles from Andy Dorman and Steven Thomson. In March 2013, St Mirren won the Scottish League Cup beating Heart of Midlothian 3–2 at Hampden to win their first cup since 1987.

In the 2010s the club drew praise for their youth development, bringing through several players from their academy (despite it not being listed among the 'elite' group assessed by the SFA in 2017) including Stevie Mallan, Jack Baird, Kyle Magennis, Jason Naismith, Kyle McAllister, Sean Kelly and full Scotland internationals Kenny McLean, Lewis Morgan and John McGinn.

Stadium 

St Mirren played at four different venues before moving to their ground at St Mirren Park, or Love Street, in 1894. The record attendance for the ground was 47,438 versus Celtic in 1949. Love Street saw extensive redevelopment in the late 90s to comply with both the recommendations of the Taylor Report and SPL regulations and the ground eventually became a 10,866 seater venue. The ground had four stands of which the most recent, the West or Reid Kerr Family Stand, was built in 2000 in order for Love Street to meet the criteria for entry to the Scottish Premier League. The oldest stand was the main stand which had a basic wooden construction. The north bank was popular with the hardcore St Mirren fans while the largest stand, the steeply raked West Stand, housed a sporting facility underneath.

On 24 May 2005, Renfrewshire Council granted permission for the club to develop their old ground. This involved the sale of the ground to a supermarket chain, and the construction of a ground in Ferguslie Park, Paisley (through a separate planning permission). The sale of their old ground allowed the club to finance the new stadium as well as clear their debts. In April 2007 it was announced that a deal had been struck with supermarket giant Tesco and on 15 January 2009 St Mirren moved to a new 8,000 seat stadium, also called St Mirren Park.

The opening game finished as a 1–1 draw with Kilmarnock, with Killie's Kevin Kyle scoring the first goal, and Dennis Wyness equalising. St Mirren's first notable win at the new stadium came on 7 March 2009 in a 1–0 victory over Celtic in the Homecoming Scottish Cup Quarter Final.

The stadium had a total seating capacity of 8,023 which was reduced in 2017 to 7,937 following the installation of a new disabled access platform.

The stadium was known as The Simple Digital Arena after the club agreed a four-year, six-figure deal with Simple Digital Solutions on 13 June 2018.

It is currently known as The SMiSA Stadium.

Colours and sponsors 
The traditional home colours of St Mirren are black and white stripes, however for the first season the colours were scarlet and blue. There is some dispute as to why the colours black and white were chosen. A popular theory is that the stripes represent the Black and White Cart rivers which run through Paisley. In recent years there has been evidence unearthed that the Monks in the local abbey wore black and white striped habits. The team strips have varied very little in the long history of the club, however the thickness of the stripes have often varied. Some years have seen horizontal stripes used.

Having first played in black and white vertical stripes in 1884, Saints were the first club in the world to do so, six years before Notts County.

Away tops are traditionally red or all black, but in some cases strips have varied from orange to light blue, as seen on the 2010–11 strip. From 2007–2011, the Danish firm, Hummel International, replaced Xara as kit manufacturers. After spells with Carbrini (2011–2012, 2015–2017) and Diadora (2012–2014) the club signed a deal with kit manufacturers Joma.

St Mirren has had several main sponsors, mainly in the transport industry, with several local bus companies and car dealerships like Arriva and Phoenix Honda sponsoring in the club. St Mirren were sponsored by Braehead Shopping Centre, a local shopping centre four miles away in Renfrew from 2005–2017. They are currently sponsored by the solicitors firm Digby Brown.
In August 2010, the club confirmed Barrhead company Compass Private Hire would have their name displayed on the back of the first team players' shirts as well as on their shorts. Compass Private Hire were co-owned by former St Mirren player, captain and manager, Tony Fitzpatrick.

Mascots 
In recent years, St Mirren have been represented by three mascots, the Pandas. They are Paisley Panda, Junior P and Mrs Panda. The regular mascots are Paisley Panda and Junior P.

Honours

Major honours
Scottish Cup:
Winners (3): 1925–26, 1958–59, 1986–87
Runners-up: 1907–08, 1933–34, 1961–62
Scottish League Cup: 
Winners (1): 2012–13
Runners-up: 1955–56, 2009–10

Minor honours
Scottish league, second tier (5): 1967–68, 1976–77, 1999–00, 2005–06, 2017–18
Scottish Challenge Cup: 2005
Renfrewshire Cup (55): 1882–83, 1883–84, 1887–88, 1890–91, 1893–94, 1896–97, 1897–98, 1903–04, 1909–10, 1910–11, 1923–24, 1924–25, 1925–26, 1927–28, 1928–29, 1929–30, 1931–32, 1932–33, 1933–34, 1935–36, 1937–38, 1940–41, 1943–44, 1945–46, 1946–47, 1947–48, 1949–50, 1958–59, 1959–60, 1960–61, 1962–63, 1966–67, 1973–74, 1976–77, 1978–79, 1979–80, 1982–83, 1983–84, 1984–85, 1985–86, 1987–88, 1989–90, 1997–98, 1998–99, 1999–00, 2000–01, 2001–02, 2006–07, 2007–08, 2008–09, 2009–10, 2010–11, 2011–12, 2012–13, 2014–15
Victory Cup: 1919
Anglo-Scottish Cup: 1979–80
Summer Cup: 1943
Epson Invitational Tournament: 1986–87
Barcelona Cup Winners: 1922

Rivalries 

The club has a fierce rivalry with neighbours Greenock Morton, a rivalry which sees a large amount of animosity between the two sets of fans.

Club records 
Highest home attendance: 47,438 v. Celtic on 20 August 1949
Highest average home attendance: 17,333, 1949–50 (15 games)
Biggest victory: 15–0 v. Glasgow University, Scottish Cup, 30 January 1960
Most capped player: Iain Munro and Billy Thomson: 7 appearances for Scotland
Most capped international player: Mo Camara: 79 appearances for Guinea
Youngest Player: Dylan Reid: 16 years & 6 days – vs. Rangers (Ibrox), 6 March 2021
Most Competitive Appearances: Hugh Murray, 462 (1997–2012)
Most League appearances: Hugh Murray, 399 (1997–2012)
Most European appearances: Billy Abercromby, 9 (1980–1988)
Most League goals:   David McCrae, 221 (1923–1934)
Most League goals in a season: Dunky Walker, 45 (1921–22)
Record transfer fee paid: £400,000 to Bayer Uerdingen for Thomas Stickroth (March 1990)
Record transfer fee received: £850,000 from Rangers for Ian Ferguson (February 1988)
Most League wins in a season: 27, Division Two (1967–68)
Most League defeats in a season: 31, Division One (1920–21)
Most League draws in a season: 15, Premier League (1987–88)
Most consecutive league victories: 16, Division Two (18 November 1967 – 30 March 1968)
Longest unbeaten league run: 34, 18 November 1967 (Division Two) – 16 November 1968 (Division One)
Most Goals Scored in a season: 100, Division Two (1967–68)
Most Goals Conceded in a season: 92, Division One (1920–21)

Players

First-team squad

On loan

Club staff

Board of directors

Coaching staff

Managers 

John McCartney (June 1904 – January 1910)
 Barry Grieve (Feb – June 1910)
 Hugh Law (July 1910 – July 1916)
Johnny Cochrane (July 1916 – April 1928)
 Donald Turner (April 1928 – April 1929)
 John Morrison (June 1929 – Oct 36)
 Sam Blythe (Oct 1936 – Feb 41)
 Donald Menzies (Feb 1941 – Dec 42)
Willie Fotheringham (Dec 1942 – May 45)
 Bobby Rankin (May 1945 – Aug 54)
Willie Reid (Aug 1954 – Dec 61)
Bobby Flavell (Dec 1961 – Dec 62)
 Jackie Cox (Dec 1962 – May 65)
Doug Millward (June 1965 – Dec 66)
Alex Wright (Dec 1966 – Oct 70)
Wilson Humphries (Nov 1970 – Jan 72)
Tommy Bryceland (Jan 1972 – May 73)
Willie Cunningham (June 1973 – Oct 74)
Alex Ferguson (Oct 1974 – May 78)
Jim Clunie (June 1978 – Nov 80)
Rikki McFarlane (November 1980 – Oct 1983)
Alex Miller (October 1983 – December 1986)
Alex Smith (December 1986 – April 1988)
Tony Fitzpatrick (April 1988 – May 1991)
David Hay (May 1991 – May 1992)
Jimmy Bone (May 1992 – August 1996)
Iain Munro (9 September 1996 – 10 September 1996) (24 hours)
Tony Fitzpatrick (September 1996 – December 1998)
Tom Hendrie (December 1998 – September 2002)
John Coughlin (September 2002 – November 2003)
Gus MacPherson (25 November 2003 – 11 May 2010)
Danny Lennon (7 June 2010 – 12 May 2014)
Tommy Craig (13 May 2014 – 9 December 2014)
Gary Teale (9 December 2014 – 23 May 2015)
Ian Murray (24 May 2015 – 12 December 2015)
Alex Rae (18 December 2015 – 18 September 2016)
Allan McManus (18 September 2016 – 10 October 2016) (Interim)
Jack Ross (10 October 2016 –25 May 2018)
Alan Stubbs (8 June 2018 – 3 September 2018)
Oran Kearney (7 September 2018 – 26 June 2019)
Jim Goodwin (28 June 2019 – 19 February 2022)
Stephen Robinson (22 February 2022 – present)

European record

Notes

References

External links 

 Official St Mirren F.C. website
 'Historical Database' of St Mirren F.C.
 The St.Mirren Programme Archive
 St Mirren BBC My Club 

 
Association football clubs established in 1877
Football clubs in Scotland
Scottish Premier League teams
1877 establishments in Scotland
Scottish Football League teams
Sport in Paisley, Renfrewshire
Scottish Football League founder members
Scottish Cup winners
Scottish Challenge Cup winners
Scottish Professional Football League teams
Scottish League Cup winners
Football in Renfrewshire